Tarot is a 2009 Filipino horror-thriller film directed by Jun Lana and starring Marian Rivera and Dennis Trillo. The film was produced by Regal Entertainment and was distributed by GMA Pictures.

Plot
Kara always sees her grandmother (Gloria Romero) always using tarot cards to tell the person's fortunes. She was enchanted to try to use it, despite her families' protests. She later played the tarot that reads that someone will die, which is her grandmother. Her mother put the tarot cards on her mother's grave.

Many years later, Kara (Marian Rivera) is engaged with her fiancée (Dennis Trillo) and goes into hiking. But she senses something is wrong. Her doubt is right, as a storm hits their position and her fiancée is lost in the middle of the storm. She was later rescued by her group. She tries to rebuild her life, until her fiancée returned. But after that, several mysterious and horrific events happen to them.

Later, the mysterious ghosts revealed that they are former members of a cult who sacrificed themselves, save 2 women. One of those women is her grandmother. Using the tarot card, she tried to solve the problem, but they got worse.

Later, they return to the mountains searching for a clue, when an old man, who was her grandfather (and the leader of the same cult where the ghosts belong) warns them, but the ghosts are claiming one life after another. And the only solution – the old man must kill himself to relieve the ghosts' anguish. But her fiancée dies when he falls in a ravine.

Kara returns many months later, pregnant and laying flowers on her lover's death site.

Cast

 Marian Rivera as Cara
 Dennis Trillo as Miguel
 Roxanne Guinoo as Faye
 Gloria Romero as Lola Auring
 Celia Rodriguez as Lola Nena
 Dante Rivero as El Señor
 Ana Capri as Connie
 Alwyn Uytingco as Sol
 Niña Jose as Young Lola Auring
 Glaiza de Castro as Young Lola Nena
 Rich Asuncion as Young Nana Upeng
 Nikki Samonte as Young Cara
 Ama Quiambao as Nana Upeng
 Susan Africa as Diana
 Ricardo Cepeda as Ronnie
 Malou Crisologo as Myrna

Reception

See also
 List of ghost films

References

External links
 Tarot at the Internet Movie Database
  as archived February 4, 2010

2009 films
Regal Entertainment films
Filipino-language films
2000s Tagalog-language films
2000s horror thriller films
Philippine horror thriller films